Accentus Austria are an early music ensemble led by viola-da-gamba player Thomas Wimmer, founded in 1988.

Discography
 Sephardische Romanzen
Musik der spanischen Juden um 1500,  Gruppe Accentus, Ensemble für Frühe Musik, Preiser Records 90161:
1. Mi suegra. 2. Sadawi. etc.
 El Cancionero de Palacio 1505-1520 Naxos 1996.
 Track list
 1. Rodrigo Martinez. 2. Con amores. etc. 
 Sephardic Romances. Naxos 1997:
 1. Avrix mi galanica. 2. La serena. 3. Sadawi
 Misteris de Dolor. Pneuma PN-410 2004
 Romances Sefarades dans l’empire de la Sublime Porte  Arcana 2006  1. Nacimiento y vocación de Abraham
 Cantadas de pasión. Sebastian Duron, Juan de Lima Serqueira, Gaspar Sanz, Juan Hidalgo, Joan Bautista Cabanilles, Lucas Ruiz de Ribayaz y Fonseca, Jose Marin, Matias Veana, Juan de Navas. Arcana.2005
 Serenata Hungarica. DHM 2012 
 Cristobal Galan Ice DHM. 2013.

References

Early music groups
Austrian musical groups